Tomo Vinković was a Croatian company that manufactured tractors and agricultural machines. It was founded in 1953 in Bjelovar, SR Croatia. Its products were exported to Poland, Czechoslovakia and Portugal. After it became defunct in 1991, it was succeeded by Hittner company.

Its tractors are still popular today in Croatia, with high demand on the classified-ads website Njuškalo.

External links
Tractor manual

References

Garden tool manufacturers
Lawn and garden tractors
Motor vehicle manufacturers of Croatia
Companies of Croatia